Leyland Motors Football Club was a semi-professional football club playing their home matches at County Ground, Leyland.

Leyland Motors played in the Lancashire Combination from 1933 until 1980 when they joined the Cheshire County League, where they played for two seasons, before becoming founder members of the North West Counties Football League in 1982. In 1990 they changed name to Leyland DAF-SGL and in 1992 were demoted to the West Lancashire Football League, before another name change to Leyland Motors Athletic in 1993. Then in 2001 they left the league altogether.

A separate club, also called Leyland Motors, competed in the Surrey Senior League.

References

Defunct football clubs in Lancashire
Defunct football clubs in England
Lancashire Combination
North West Counties Football League clubs
West Lancashire Football League
Leyland, Lancashire
Association football clubs disestablished in 2001
Works association football teams in England
Cheshire County League clubs